Josh Hanlon (born 7 August 1997) is an Australian Paralympic alpine skier who represented Australia at the 2022 Winter Paralympics.

Personal

Josh Hanlon was born on 7 August 1997. He comes from Weethalle, New South Wales. At age 20, Hanlon 's had severe bacterial infection, which  resulted in toxic shock and sepsis and led to him becoming a  double below-knee amputee and the loss of his right hand at the wrist. Hanlon is studying for a Certificate 3 and 4 in physical fitness.

Skiing
Prior to his Para alpine sit skiing career, Hanlon was a member Greater Western Sydney Giants Academy teams from the age of 15 to 19.  In 2019, he became a member  Australian Winter Para-alpine development squad. He is  classified as an LW12-2 skier. Hanlon travelled overseas with the Australian Winter Para-alpine development squad during the 2019–20 season.

At the 2021 World Para Snow Sports Championships in Lillehammer, he finished 16th in the Giant Slalom Sitting.

Hanlon at the 2022 Winter Paralympics competed in two events and finished sixth in the Slalom Sitting and 11th in the Giant Slalom Sitting.

Recognition
2022 - Paralympics Australia Rookie Of The Year

References

External links
 

Australian male alpine skiers
Alpine skiers at the 2022 Winter Paralympics
Paralympic alpine skiers of Australia
Living people
1997 births